The Riverdale Park Historic District is a national historic district located at Riverdale Park, Prince George's County, Maryland.  The community developed starting in 1889, around the B & O passenger railroad station, as an early railroad suburb northeast of Washington, D.C.  Later, 20th century additions expanded the community. One of the more imposing features of the community is the early-19th-century mansion known as Riversdale.  In general residential styles range from large -story wood-frame dwellings to smaller bungalows, with an eclectic collection of imposing Queen Anne and Colonial Revival houses.

It was listed on the National Register of Historic Places in 2002.

Gallery

References

External links
, including photo in 2001, at Maryland Historical Trust website
Boundary Map of the Riverdale Park Historic District, Prince George's County, at Maryland Historical Trust

Historic districts in Prince George's County, Maryland
Queen Anne architecture in Maryland
Houses on the National Register of Historic Places in Maryland
Houses in Prince George's County, Maryland
Historic districts on the National Register of Historic Places in Maryland
National Register of Historic Places in Prince George's County, Maryland
Riverdale Park, Maryland